Rosa henryi is a rose species native to  China. The species is a climbing shrub, 3–8 m, with long repent branches. Prickles are absent or scattered, curved. Leaves are glabrous or sparsely glandular-pubescent with commonly 5 leaflets. The flowers appear in mid to late summer, 5–15 in an umbel-like corymb, each flower 3–4 cm in diameter, white, and fragrant. The hips are brownish red.

It grows in forest margins, thickets or scrub, valleys or farmland at 1700–2000 m alt.

Cultivation and uses
Rosa henryi is grown as an ornamental plant for its beautiful flowers.

References

henryi
Flora of China